Direct air capture (DAC) is the use of chemical or physical processes to extract carbon dioxide directly from the ambient air. If the extracted  is then sequestered in safe long-term storage (called direct air carbon capture and sequestration (DACCS)), the overall process will achieve carbon dioxide removal and be a "negative emissions technology" (NET). As of 2022, DAC has yet to become profitable because the cost of using DAC to sequester carbon dioxide is several times the carbon price. 

The carbon dioxide is captured directly from the ambient air; this is contrast to carbon capture and storage (CCS) which captures CO2 from point sources, such as a cement factory or a bioenergy plant. Carbon dioxide removal is achieved when ambient air makes contact with chemical media, typically an aqueous alkaline solvent or sorbents. These chemical media are subsequently stripped of CO2 through the application of energy (namely heat), resulting in a CO2 stream that can undergo dehydration and compression, while simultaneously regenerating the chemical media for reuse.

It would require renewable energies to power since approximately 400kJ of work is needed per mole of CO2 capture. DACCS can act as a carbon dioxide removal mechanism (or a carbon negative technology), although  it has yet to be profitable because the cost per tonne of carbon dioxide is several times the carbon price. 

DAC was suggested in 1999 and is still in development. Several commercial plants are planned or in operation in Europe and the US. Large-scale DAC deployment may be accelerated when connected with economical applications or policy incentives.

In contrast to carbon capture and storage (CCS) which captures emissions from a point source such as a factory, DAC reduces the carbon dioxide concentration in the atmosphere as a whole. Typically, CCS is recommended for large and stationary sources of CO2 rather than distributed and movable ones. On the contrary, DAC has no limitation on sources.

Methods of capture 

Most commercial techniques require large fans to push ambient air through a filter. More recently, Ireland-based company Carbon Collect Limited has developed the MechanicalTree™ which simply stands in the wind to capture . The company claims this 'passive capture' of  significantly reduces the energy cost of Direct Air Capture, and that its geometry lends itself to scaling for gigaton  capture.

Most commercial techniques use a liquid solvent—usually amine-based or caustic—to absorb  from a gas. This carbonate is heated to produce a highly pure gaseous  stream. Sodium hydroxide can be recycled from sodium carbonate in a process of causticizing. Alternatively, the  binds to solid sorbent in the process of chemisorption.

Among the specific chemical processes that are being explored, three stand out: causticization with alkali and alkali-earth hydroxides, carbonation, and organic−inorganic hybrid sorbents consisting of amines supported in porous adsorbents.

Other explored methods 
The idea of using many small dispersed DAC scrubbers—analogous to live plants—to create environmentally significant reduction in  levels, has earned the technology a name of artificial trees in popular media.

Moisture swing sorbent 
In a cyclical process designed in 2012 by professor Klaus Lackner, the director of the Center for Negative Carbon Emissions (CNCE), dilute  can be efficiently separated using an anionic exchange polymer resin called Marathon MSA, which absorbs air  when dry, and releases it when exposed to moisture. A large part of the energy for the process is supplied by the latent heat of phase change of water. The technology requires further research to determine its cost-effectiveness.

Metal-organic frameworks 

Other substances which can be used are Metal-organic frameworks (or MOF's).

Membranes 
Membrane separation of  rely on semi-permeable membranes. This method requires little water and has a smaller footprint.

Environmental impact 
Proponents of DAC argue that it is an essential component of climate change mitigation. Researchers posit that DAC could help contribute to the goals of the Paris Agreement (namely limiting the increase in global average temperature to well below 2 °C above pre-industrial levels). However, others claim that relying on this technology is risky and might postpone emission reduction under the notion that it will be possible to fix the problem later, and suggest that reducing emissions may be a better solution.

DAC relying on amine-based absorption demands significant water input. It was estimated, that to capture 3.3 gigatonnes of  a year would require 300 km3 of water, or 4% of the water used for irrigation. On the other hand, using sodium hydroxide needs far less water, but the substance itself is highly caustic and dangerous.

Because of this implied demand for energy, some geoengineering promoters have proposed using "small nuclear power plants" connected to DAC installations.

When DAC is combined with a carbon capture and storage (CCS) system, it can produce a negative emissions plant, but it would require a carbon-free electricity source. The use of any fossil-fuel-generated electricity would end up releasing more  to the atmosphere than it would capture. Moreover, using DAC for enhanced oil recovery would cancel any supposed climate mitigation benefits.

Applications 
Practical applications of DAC include:

enhanced oil recovery,
 production of carbon-neutral synthetic fuel and plastics,
 beverage carbonation,
carbon sequestration,
 improving concrete strength,
 creating carbon-neutral concrete alternative,
 enhancing productivity of algae farms,
enrichment of air in greenhouses

These applications require different concentrations of  product formed from the captured gas. Forms of carbon sequestration such as geological storage require pure  products  (concentration > 99%), while other applications such as agriculture can function with more dilute products (~ 5%). Since the air that is processed through DAC originally contains 0.04%  (or 400 ppm), creating a pure product requires more energy than a dilute product and is thus typically more expensive.

DAC is not an alternative to traditional, point-source carbon capture and storage (CCS), rather it is a complementary technology that could be utilized to manage carbon emissions from distributed sources, fugitive emissions from the CCS network, and leakage from geological formations. Because DAC can be deployed far from the source of pollution, synthetic fuel produced with this method can use already existing fuel transport infrastructure.

Cost

One of the largest hurdles to implementing DAC is a cost required to separate  and air. A study from 2011 estimated that a plant designed to capture 1 megatonne of  a year would cost $2.2billion.

It is estimated that the total system cost is $1,000 per tonne of CO2, according to  an economic and energetic analysis from 2011.

An economic study of a pilot plant in British Columbia, Canada, conducted from 2015 to 2018, estimated the cost at $94–232 per tonne of atmospheric  removed. It is worth noting that the study was done by Carbon Engineering, which has financial interest in commercializing DAC technology.

Large-scale DAC deployment can be accelerated by policy incentives.

Development

Carbon Engineering 

Carbon Engineering is a commercial DAC company founded in 2009 and backed, among others, by Bill Gates and Murray Edwards. , it runs a pilot plant in British Columbia, Canada, that has been in use since 2015 and is able to extract about a tonne of  a day. An economic study of its pilot plant conducted from 2015 to 2018 estimated the cost at $94–232 per tonne of atmospheric  removed.

Partnering with California energy company Greyrock, Carbon Engineering converts a portion of its concentrated  into synthetic fuel, including gasoline, diesel, and jet fuel.

The company uses a potassium hydroxide solution.

Climeworks

To lower its energy requirements, the plant uses heat from a local waste incineration plant. The  is used to increase vegetable yields in a nearby greenhouse.

Climeworks partnered with Reykjavik Energy in Carbfix, a project launched in 2007. In 2017, the CarbFix2 project was started and received funding from EuropeanUnion's Horizon2020 research program. The CarbFix2 pilot plant project runs alongside a geothermal power plant in Hellisheidi, Iceland. In this approach,  is injected 700 meters under the ground and mineralizes into basaltic bedrock forming carbonate minerals. The DAC plant uses low-grade waste heat from the plant, effectively eliminating more  than they both produce.

Global Thermostat
Global Thermostat is private company founded in 2010, located in Manhattan, New York, with a plant in Huntsville, Alabama. Global Thermostat uses amine-based sorbents bound to carbon sponges to remove  from the atmosphere. The company has projects ranging from 40 to 50,000 tonnes per year.

The company claims to remove  for $120 per tonne at its facility in Huntsville.

Global Thermostat has closed deals with Coca-Cola (which aims to use DAC to source  for its carbonated beverages) and ExxonMobil which intends to start a DACtofuel business using Global Thermostat's technology.

Soletair Power
Soletair Power is a startup founded in 2016, located in Lappeenranta, Finland, operating in the fields of DAC and Power-to-X. The startup is primarily backed by the Finnish technology group Wärtsilä. According to Soletair Power, its technology is the first to combine DAC with building integration. It absorbs  from ventilation units inside buildings and captures it to improve air quality. Soletair focuses on the fact that DAC can improve employees' cognitive function by 20% per 400 ppm indoor  removed, according to one study.

The company uses the captured  in creating synthetic renewable fuel and as raw material for industrial applications. In 2020, Wärtsilä, together with Soletair Power and Q Power, created their first demonstration unit of Power-to-X for Dubai Expo 2020, that can produce synthetic methane from captured  from buildings.

Prometheus Fuels 

Is a start-up company based in Santa Cruz which launched out of Y Combinator in 2019 to remove CO2 from the air and turn it into zero-net-carbon gasoline and jet fuel. The company uses a DAC technology, adsorbing CO2 from the air directly into process electrolytes, where it is converted into alcohols by electrocatalysis. The alcohols are then separated from the electrolytes using carbon nanotube membranes, and upgraded to gasoline and jet fuels. Since the process uses only electricity from renewable sources, the fuels are carbon neutral when used, emitting no net CO2 to the atmosphere.

Other companies 

 Infinitree – earlier known as Kilimanjaro Energy and Global Research Technology. Part of US-based Carbon Sink. Demonstrated a pre-prototype of economically viable DAC technology in 2007
 Skytree – a company from Netherlands
 UK Carbon Capture and Storage Research Centre
Center for Negative Carbon Emissions of Arizona State University
 Carbyon – a startup company in Eindhoven, the Netherlands
 TerraFixing – a startup in Ottawa, Canada
Carbfix – a subsidiary of Reykjavik Energy, Iceland
Energy Impact Center – a research institute that advocates for the use nuclear energy to power direct air capture technologies.

See also 

 Artificial photosynthesis
 Carbon dioxide removal
 Water capture of CO₂

References 

Carbon dioxide removal
Carbon dioxide
Climate engineering
Emerging technologies
Sustainability
Direct air capture